The Ugaritic texts are a corpus of ancient cuneiform texts discovered since 1928 in Ugarit (Ras Shamra) and Ras Ibn Hani in Syria, and written in Ugaritic, an otherwise unknown Northwest Semitic language. Approximately 1,500 texts and fragments have been found to date. The texts were written in the 13th and 12th centuries BCE.

The most famous of the Ugarit texts are the approximately fifty epic poems; the three major literary texts are the Baal Cycle, the Legend of Keret, and the Tale of Aqhat. The other texts include 150 tablets describing the Ugaritic cult and rituals, 100 letters of correspondence, a very small number of legal texts (Akkadian is considered to have been the contemporary language of law), and hundreds of administrative or economic texts.

Unique among the Ugarit texts are the earliest known abecedaries, lists of letters in alphabetic cuneiform, where not only the canonical order of Phoenician script is evidenced, but also the traditional names for letters of the alphabet.

Other tablets found in the same location were written in other cuneiform languages (Sumerian, Hurrian and Akkadian), as well as Egyptian and Luwian hieroglyphs, and Cypro-Minoan.

Discoveries

Initial discovery
On excavation of the city of Ugarit, found by accident in 1928–29 at Ras Shamra, Syria, several deposits of cuneiform clay tablets were found; all dating from the last phase of Ugarit, around 1200 BCE. The texts were found to be written in an otherwise unknown Northwest Semitic language. Other tablets found in the same location were written in other cuneiform languages (Sumerian, Hurrian and Akkadian), as well as Egyptian and Luwian hieroglyphs, and Cypro-Minoan.

The tablets were found in a palace library, a temple library and—apparently unique in the world at the time—two private libraries, one belonging to a diplomat named Rapanu. The libraries at Ugarit contained diplomatic, legal, economic, administrative, scholastic, literary and religious texts.

1958 excavations
During excavations in 1958, yet another library of tablets was uncovered. These were, however, sold on the black market and not immediately recovered. The "Claremont Ras Shamra Tablets" are now housed at the Institute for Antiquity and Christianity, School of Religion, Claremont Graduate University, Claremont, California. They were edited by Loren R. Fisher in 1971.

1973 excavations
After 1970, succeeding Claude Schaeffer were Henri de Contenson, followed by Jean Margueron, Marguerite Yon, then Yves Calvet and Bassam Jamous, who since 2005 has held the office of Director General of Antiquities and Museums. In 1973, an archive containing around 120 tablets was discovered during rescue excavations.

1994 excavations
In 1994 more than 300 further tablets dating to the end of the Late Bronze Age were discovered within a large ashlar masonry building.

Notable texts

Approximately 1,500 texts and fragments have been found to date, all of which have been dated to the 13th and 12th centuries BCE. The most famous of the Ugarit texts are the approximately fifty epic poems. The most important literary document recovered from Ugarit is arguably the Baal Cycle, describing the basis for the religion and cult of the Canaanite Baal; the two other particularly well known texts are the Legend of Keret and the Tale of Aqhat. The other texts include 150 tablets describing the Ugaritic cult and rituals, 100 letters of correspondence, a very small number of legal texts (Akkadian is considered to have been the contemporary language of law), and hundreds of administrative or economic texts.

The tablets have been used by scholars of the Hebrew Bible to clarify Biblical Hebrew texts and have revealed ways in which the cultures of ancient Israel and Judah found parallels in the neighboring cultures. The tablets reveal parallels with Israelite practices described in the Bible; for example, Levirate marriage, giving the eldest son a larger share of the inheritance, and redemption of the first-born son were practices common to the people of Ugarit as well.

Unique among the Ugarit texts are the earliest known abecedaries, lists of letters in alphabetic cuneiform, where not only the canonical order of Hebrew-Phoenician script is evidenced, but also the traditional names for letters of the alphabet.

See also
Amarna letters
Hittite texts

Resources

  – the second edition (and the first in English) of the standard collection of Ugaritic texts
  – the first edition of the standard collection of Ugaritic texts

References

 
Ugarit
1928 archaeological discoveries
2nd-millennium BC literature
Ugaritic language and literature